Hammansburg is an unincorporated community in Wood County, in the U.S. state of Ohio.

History
Hammansburg was platted in 1873, and named for William Hammond, proprietor. A post office called Hammansburgh was established in 1876, the name was changed to Hammansburg in 1893, and the post office closed in 1905.

References

Unincorporated communities in Wood County, Ohio
Unincorporated communities in Ohio